Canterbury School is a Catholic college preparatory, coeducational boarding and day independent school for students in grades 9-12 and post-graduate. It is located in New Milford, Connecticut, United States.

History
Canterbury was founded in 1915 on the aspiration of two men: Henry O. Havemeyer, scion of a wealthy family which made its fortune in sugar refining, and Nelson Hume, a Catholic schoolmaster. They intended to establish a Roman Catholic school where young men could be guided in their religion and be prepared to attend Ivy League universities.

The school was established in New Milford, Connecticut, on the location of the former Ingleside School for Girls. Hume became the first headmaster of the school. From its start with 16 enrolled students, Nelson Hume guided the school through two world wars and the great depression until his death in 1948. He was succeeded as headmaster by Walter Sheehan, John Reydel in 1973, Roderick Clarke in 1978, Thomas Sheehy in 1990, and Rachel E. Stone in 2016. Canterbury became co-educational in the fall of 1971. The School now enrolls around 320 boarding and day students on its campus in New Milford.  Canterbury School celebrated its centennial in 2015.

Facilities

Residential

Canterbury School has eight residence halls that provide housing for about 250 students.  Each residence hall contains faculty apartments that range from the size of town houses to smaller one-bedroom suites.  Canterbury also has built single family homes on campus, providing housing for some faculty, such as the Headmaster’s House, located on the corner of Aspetuck Avenue and Elkington Farm Road.  
	 
Sheehan House (née Middle House) is named for Canterbury’s second headmaster, and is located in center of the lower campus. Simply referred to as "Sheehan" by students, it houses upper form boys.
	

Carter House (née South House) is located on the lower campus and houses upper and lower form girls.

Duffy House (née North House) is located on the northern end of the lower campus and houses lower form girls. It contains a faculty townhouse on the western end of the building, in space that was converted from administrative offices. The school's art department is also located on the ground floor.

Hickory Hearth is located at the southern end of the lower campus and provides space for ten male sophomore students (in double rooms) and three faculty members.

Havemeyer House is located on the upper campus and houses upper form boys. Nicknamed "Havey" by students, it contains two faculty townhouses which bookend the dorm.

Carmody House is located on the upper campus and houses returning sophomore, junior, and senior boys. Identical to Havemeyer, two faculty townhouses bookend the dorm. It is named after the Carmody family, one of the founding families of the school.

South House is a newly constructed building on the lower campus between Hickory Hearth and Carter House that houses upper form girls.

Religious
Chapel of Our Lady was built in 1928 and expanded in 1959. It can seat 300. Mass is celebrated every Sunday during the school year in the Chapel at 11:30 AM. The bottom floor of the chapel contains a classroom.  Its stained glass windows have been recently restored. The chapel's carillon is named for alumnus  Mel Ferrer '34.

Chaplain’s Residence  is the oldest building on campus and has had various uses, including acting as Canterbury’s first chapel.

Athletic

Outdoor facilities include 8 tennis courts, Hamilton Stadium (a multipurpose turf field and track), Sheehy Family Field (a multipurpose turf field), other multipurpose grass playing fields, and baseball and softball diamonds with dugouts 

Canterbury Offers 19 Varsity Teams in Baseball, Basketball, Field Hockey, Football, Hockey, Lacrosse, Squash, Soccer, Softball, Swimming, Tennis, Volleyball, and Wrestling. All students participate in sports and Canterbury fields Junior Varsity, Thirds and Fourth teams in support of its varsity supports.

The school competes in the New England Preparatory School Athletic Council (NEPSAC).

Notable alumni and faculty

Cofer Black '68, Vice-chairman, Blackwater USA
Joseph Campbell 1921, Mythologist, professor, author
David C. Copley '70, President of Copley Press
Richard Dickson Cudahy, '44, judge of the U.S. Court of Appeals for the Seventh Circuit
Mike Dunham '91, NHL goaltender
Dominick Dunne '44, Writer, producer, TV personality
Tommy Edison '81, popular blind YouTuber and radio traffic reporter
Mel Ferrer '35, Actor, producer, director
Frank C. Guinta '89, Former Congressman representing New Hampshire
Gerard C. Smith '31, Diplomat and chief negotiator of SALT I 
Dan Rusanowsky '79, Play-by-play announcer for the NHL's San Jose Sharks
William Randolph Hearst III '67, Venture capitalist; trustee of Hearst Trust
John Hemingway '79, Author 
John F. Kennedy, attended, President of the United States
Jimmy Lee (banker) '71, former Co-Chairman of JPMorgan's investment bank.
Donovan Mitchell (basketball), attended, NBA guard and 1st round draft pick
Sargent Shriver '34, Diplomat, Peace Corps organizer, vice-presidential candidate
Trevardo Williams '09, NFL linebacker

References

External links
 Official site
 Roman Catholic Archdiocese of Hartford

Boarding schools in Connecticut
Catholic boarding schools in the United States
Catholic secondary schools in Connecticut
Schools in Litchfield County, Connecticut
Educational institutions established in 1915
New Milford, Connecticut
1915 establishments in Connecticut